Qatavand (also Romanized as Qaţāvand and Qaţvand; also known as Kattūn, Katūn, Qaţāvan, Qatāvon, and Qateh Vand) is a village in Gol-e Cheydar Rural District, Sarshiv District, Marivan County, Kurdistan Province, Iran. At the 2006 census, its population was 124, in 24 families. The village is populated by Kurds.

References 

Towns and villages in Marivan County
Kurdish settlements in Kurdistan Province